The Fairbank Center for Chinese Studies at Harvard University is a post-graduate research center promoting the study of modern and contemporary China from a social science perspective. The center hosts and organizes academic activities, provides research funds for faculty and students, and helps policy-makers and news media to understand modern China. The center sponsors the Edwin O. Reischauer Lectures.

History
The center was established in the 1955 as the Center for East Asian Research. and on the retirement of its founding director, John K. Fairbank. The center was renamed the John K. Fairbank Center for East Asian Research. From its beginnings in 1955, its focus was on modern and contemporary China, diverging from classic sinology, which emphasized the study of texts from a humanistic perspective.

To celebrate its 60th anniversary, the center organized a symposium discussing the changes in the landscape of Chinese studies and the changing role of the center.

Directors
List of directors of the Fairbank Center:
 John K. Fairbank, 1955–73
 Ezra Vogel, 1973–75
 Dwight H. Perkins, 1975–76 (acting)
 Roy Hofheinz Jr., 1975–79
 Philip A. Kuhn, 1980–86
 Benjamin Schwartz, 1983–84 (acting)
 Roderick MacFarquhar, 1986–92
 James L. Watson, 1992–95
 Ezra Vogel, 1995–99
 Elizabeth J. Perry, 1999–2002
 Wilt L. Idema, 2002–2005
 Roderick MacFarquhar, 2005–2006
 William C. Kirby, 2006–2007
 Martin King Whyte, 2007–2008
 William C. Kirby, 2008–2010
 Mark Elliott, 2010–2011
 William C. Kirby, 2011–2013
 Mark Elliott, 2013–2015
 Michael Szonyi, 2016–present

Selected works
The center's published output encompasses 60+ works in 70+ publications in three languages and 300+ library holdings. The Fairbank Center has published academic monographs since 1956.

 Workshop on Contemporary Chinese Literature and the Performing Arts (1979)
 Introduction to Chʻing Documents (1986)
 China's New Revolution (1989)
 The Legacy of Islam in China: an International Symposium in Memory of Joseph F. Fletcher, Harvard University, 14–16 April 1989 (1989)
 Contemporary Chinese Fiction and its Literary Antecedents (1990)
 Jewish Diasporas in China: Comparative and Historical Perspectives (1992)
 Engendering China: Women, Culture and the State (1992)
 Directory of Individuals Interested in the Jews and the Jewish Communities of East, Southeast, and South Asia (1993)
 China's Mid-century Transitions: a Conference on Continuity and Change on the Mainland and Taiwan 1946-1955 (1994)
 台灣所藏中華民國經濟檔案 (1995)
 China and India : Different Roots, Differing Routes: Briefing Memorandum (1995), Jennifer B Freeman
 Unintended Social Consequences of Chinese Economic Reform (1997)
 从解冻走向建交: 中美关系正常化进程再探讨, 1969-1979 (2004)
 Princeton-Harvard China and the World Fellows Workshop: March 22, 2007 Harvard University (2007)
 하버드대학의동아시아연구 : 최근50년의발자취 (2008)

Notes

References
 Suleski, Ronald Stanley. (2005). The Fairbank Center for East Asian Research at Harvard University: a Fifty Year History, 1955-2005. Cambridge: Harvard University Press. ;  OCLC 64140358

External links
 
 Facebook, Fairbank Center
 Fairbank Center for Chinese Studies ISSUU Fairbank Center Annual Reports 2016–17 to 2021. 
 Professor Xu Zhangrun’s Letter to the Fairbank Center for Chinese Studies at Harvard University China Heritage, Wairopa Academy for New Sinology (n.d.)

Harvard University research institutes
Educational institutions established in 1955
1955 establishments in Massachusetts
Research institutes in Massachusetts
Research institutes of Sinology